Viteri is a Basque surname. Notable people with the surname include:

Pedro Viteri y Arana (born 1883), Spanish philanthropist
Cynthia Viteri (born 1965), Ecuadorian politician and journalist
Efraín Andrade Viteri (1920–1997), Ecuadorian artist
Oswaldo Viteri (born 1931), Ecuadorian artist